Sleep Tight may refer to:

Music
"Sleep Tight", a song by Sarah Brightman from the 1997 album Eden
"Sleep Tight", a song by Celine Dion from the 2004 album Miracle
"Sleep Tight", a song by Private Line
"Sleep Tight", a song by Kill Hannah from the 2006 album Until There's Nothing Left of Us
"Sleep Tight", a song by Big Bad Voodoo Daddy from the 1999 album This Beautiful Life

Other uses
Sleep Tight (film), a 2011 Spanish film
Sleep Tight, a 1987 novel by Matthew Costello
Sleep Tight, a 2014 novel by Rachel Abbott
Sleep Tight, a horse, the 1958 winner of the Goodwood Handicap
"Sleep Tight" (Angel), a 2002 episode of the television series Angel

See also